Dalseong Ha clan is one of the Korean clans. Their Bon-gwan is in Dalseong County, Daegu. The population was 4052. The word Ha clan (夏) came from China and was not in common in Korea. Dalseong Ha clan was naturalized from Song dynasty to Goryeo, and there was some Ha clan members who naturalized recently. Their founder was  who was a Grand Chief Controller (大都督) in Song dynasty.  was naturalized in Goryeo during the Injong of Goryeo’s (1122-1146) reign and settled in Dalseong. Ha Yong was the children of ’s. Ha Yong’s descendant made Dalseong their Bon-gwan.

See also 
 Korean clan names of foreign origin

References

External links 
 

 
Ha clans
Korean clan names of Chinese origin